Wabaunsee is an unincorporated community in Wabaunsee County, Kansas, United States.  As of the 2020 census, the population of the community and nearby areas was 104.  It was named for former Pottawatomi chief Wabaunsee.

History
Wabaunsee was founded in 1855 by a group of nearly 100 emigrants from New Haven, Connecticut.  They were inspired by a sermon given by well-known abolitionist Henry Ward Beecher, who gave money to help supply rifles for the men to defend themselves.  The rifles were smuggled through pro-slavery areas in crates marked "Beecher's Bibles."

Wabaunsee was staunchly anti-slavery and became part of the Underground Railroad in late 1856 and helped Lawrence after Quantrill's Raid.  In 1862, the Beecher Bible and Rifle Church was completed and after the Civil War Wabaunsee hoped for a railroad but it was constructed north of the river.

Wabaunsee served as the county seat until after the Civil War, when the seat was transferred to Alma.

Today, the community consists of several houses and buildings including the church which is on the National Register of Historic Places.

Geography
Wabaunsee is located about a half mile south of the Kansas River.  It is located in Wabaunsee Township along K-18 two miles west of K-99.

Demographics

For statistical purposes, the United States Census Bureau has defined this community as a census-designated place (CDP).

Wabaunsee is part of the Topeka, Kansas Metropolitan Statistical Area.

Education
The community is served by Wamego USD 320 public school district.

Transportation
I-70 is about nine miles south of Wabaunsee and US-24 is three miles north in Wamego.  Most of the community is situated on the south side of K-18.  Streets are maintained by the local county.

References

Further reading

External links
 Wabaunsee County maps: Current, Historic, KDOT

Unincorporated communities in Kansas
Unincorporated communities in Wabaunsee County, Kansas
Topeka metropolitan area, Kansas
Populated places on the Underground Railroad
1855 establishments in Kansas Territory